The Kölner Observatorium für SubMillimeter Astronomie (KOSMA) was a radio telescope for submillimeter astronomy located at  on Gornergrat near Zermatt (Switzerland). It was operated by I. Physikalisches Institut, University of Cologne, and Radioastronomisches Institut, University of Bonn.

It was equipped with heterodyne receivers covering 210 to 820 GHz, corresponding to wavelengths between 0.35 and 1.4 mm, for observations of lines from the interstellar medium.

Because of the good climatic conditions at the altitude of 3135 m (10285 ft), astronomical observatories have been located in both towers of the Kulmhotel at Gornergrat since 1967. In 1985, the KOSMA telescope was installed in the southern tower by the Universität zu Köln and, in the course of 1995, replaced by a new dish and mount. In the northern tower, a 1.5 m infrared telescope was operated until 2005 by an Italian association of universities (TIRGO).

In 2010, the telescope was moved to a site in Yangbajain in Damxung County in Tibet at an altitude of 4300m and renamed CCOSMA.

See also 
 The James Clerk Maxwell submillimeter telescope
 The California Submillimeter Observatory
 Science and technology in Switzerland

References

Submillimetre telescopes
Radio telescopes
Science and technology in Switzerland
Astronomical observatories in Switzerland